Ana Elizabeth Mosquera Gómez (born March 16, 1991) is a Venezuelan model and beauty queen who was crowned Miss International 2010, becoming the sixth woman from her country to capture the Miss International title.

Early life
Born in Maracaibo, Zulia, Mosquera grew up in Cabimas, with 3 brothers and one sister and was studying civil engineering at the University of Zulia in Maracaibo prior to her participation in Miss Venezuela 2009.

Pageants

Miss Venezuela International

International Queen of Coffee
Prior to her participation in Miss International, Mosquera represented Venezuela at Reinado Internacional del Café 2010, held in Manizales, Colombia on January 9, 2010, and placed fifth.

Miss International 2010
As the official representative of her country to the 2010 Miss International pageant held in Chengdu, China on  November 7, 2010, Mosquera competed against 69 other delegates and was crowned the eventual winner of the title, becoming the sixth woman from Venezuela to capture the Miss International crown in 50 years of history. She had a homage in Super Sabado Sensacional on Venevisión (Venezuela's main TV network). She appears on television in Venezuela and she works with children, humanitarian and charity of the Cisneros Foundation.

References

External links
Official Miss International website - Past titleholders

1991 births
Living people
Miss Venezuela International winners
Miss International winners
People from Valera
Miss International 2010 delegates
Venezuelan beauty pageant winners
University of Zulia alumni